Don't Forget the Lyrics! is the British version Don't Forget the Lyrics! game show franchise, and is based on the RDF USA game show of the same title. It began broadcasting on Sky1 on 11 May 2008, and aired its final show on 9 August 2009. Presented by Shane Richie, the show's contestants compete to win up to £250,000 by correctly recalling song lyrics from a variety of genres.

Overview
In this show, a single contestant is prompted to complete song lyrics for increasing amounts of money. After each correct answer, the contestant can continue playing, risking what has already been earned, or quit the game and take home all the money they already earned. Contestant that correctly completes nine song lyrics, are given a lyric from any top ten song from the past forty years that has featured in the Top 40 UK Singles Chart. Contestant completing the final lyric correctly wins the grand prize of £250,000. The band is led by Jess Bailey.

Gameplay

The game begins with a player facing a board of nine categories. From each category, is a choice of two songs, one of which they must attempt. They are given a certain number of words they must sing that are missing. Once the player is ready, the band begin to play and the words come up on the large screen within the studio (and also at the bottom of the screen for the audience at home). The player then must sing along in a karaoke style, until the band stops playing and the words on the screen change to blank spaces according to how many words are missing. The player must then attempt to fill in these blanks. They are then allowed to either "lock in" those lyrics, use one of their three "back-ups", similar to lifelines, to help them out or walk away with the money they have already won (unless, it is the first song attempted). If the lyrics are locked in, they'll change from yellow to blue, before being revealed as correct or not. They'll change to green if they are correct, and red if any or all of them are incorrect. If there are any correct words featured, yet there are other incorrect, the correct words turn green, and the incorrect change to red. If the player locks in words before the £5,000 level and gets any wrong, that player leaves with nothing. After passing the £5,000 level, if the player locks in any lyrics and they are incorrect, he or she drops back down to or remains at £5,000, and that is the amount the player will leave with. This process carries on until the £250,000 song.

Backups
There are three helps, or "backups" that the player can use for assistance (this concept is similar to the "3 lifelines" concept from Who Wants to be a Millionaire?). "Backup singers" allows one of two friends or family members the opportunity to help the player. "2 Words" allows the contestant to choose any two of the missing words after they have answered but before the answer is locked in, and they will be told what those words are. When the player uses the "2 Words" backup and selects a word that is incorrect, it will automatically be corrected. "3 Lines" gives them three possible answers, of which one is correct. Each backup may only be used once, right up to and including the £125,000 song, but not including the jackpot song. Contestants are required to use up their backups on the £125,000 song if they have not done so already.

Right/wrong lyrics
If a song is chosen by a contestant where it is a cover version, it is that version that is deemed correct.

All songs are independently verified by three sources, and the decision of the production team as to what the correct version of the lyrics are is final. However, stated in the rules, if a contestant felt that the lyrics they locked in were definitely correct, yet proven differently, they had every opportunity to contest the decision after filming, but the likelihood the decision would be reversed was highly unlikely to happen.

Winners

£125,000 winners
 Helen Norgrove (24 January 2009)
 Joe Connors (26 April 2009)

Transmissions

Original series

Specials

External links
.

2008 British television series debuts
2009 British television series endings
2000s British game shows
2000s British music television series
British television series based on American television series
Don't Forget the Lyrics!
English-language television shows
Musical game shows
Sky UK original programming
Television series by Banijay